The Green Fisherman (Italian: Il Pescatore Verde) is a fictional character who appears in Carlo Collodi's book The Adventures of Pinocchio (Le avventure di Pinocchio).

According to Giacomo Maria Prati, The Green Fisherman is one example of the story's parallels with classical mythology, stating that the Fisherman is evocative of the cyclops Polyphemus of Homer's Odyssey. He also writes that The Fisherman represents murder through ignorance, referring to the fact that he tries to eat Pinocchio, unaware he was not an edible fish.

Role

The Green Fisherman is an ogre who dwells in a sea cave on the coast of Busy Bee Island (Isola delle Api Industriose) where he lives on a diet seemingly composed entirely of sea life. He is described as "...so ugly, he looked like a sea monster. Instead of hair, he had on his head a dense clump of green grass; green was the skin on his body, green were his eyes, green was his long beard which drooped downwards. He looked like a great lizard erected on its hind legs."

Encountered in chapter XXVIII, the Fisherman accidentally captures Pinocchio in his net while fishing. He is surprised that Pinocchio is able to talk, but does not understand when he identifies himself as a "puppet". The Fisherman deduces that Pinocchio is a kind of rare "puppet-fish" and refuses to let Pinocchio escape. When Pinocchio breaks down in despair, the Fisherman decides to fry him. Just as the Fisherman is about to lower Pinocchio into a frying pan, his cave is visited by a mastiff named Alidoro, attracted by the smell. The mastiff, upon recognizing Pinocchio, pounces on the Fisherman and takes the puppet away.

Media portrayals

The Fisherman has so far appeared in three film adaptations of Collodi's book:

In Giannetto Guardone's Le avventure di Pinocchio (1947), portrayed by Vittorio Gassman, in which he is foolish and lets Pinocchio go as he walks out.
In Giuliano Cenci's 1972 animated film The Adventures of Pinocchio, that shows the Fisherman (voiced by Arturo Dominici in Italian and by Paul Frees in English) almost exactly as he is portrayed in the book.
In Enzo D'Alò's 2012 animated film Pinocchio, voiced by singer Lucio Dalla in Italian and by Harry Standjofski in English.

References

Bibliography
Collodi, Le Avventure di Pinocchio 1883, Biblioteca Universale Rizzoli

Fictional ogres
Fictional mermen and mermaids
Fictional Italian people in literature
Pinocchio characters
Literary characters introduced in 1883
Male characters in literature